Baker's worm lizard  (Amphisbaena bakeri) is a species of worm lizard in the family Amphisbaenidae.

Geographic rangeA. bakeri is endemic to Puerto Rico.

Habitat

ReproductionA. bakeri is oviparous.

Etymology
The specific name, bakeri, is in honor of Arthur B. Baker, a zoologist with the United States Fish Commission in Puerto Rico, who collected the type specimen.

See also

List of amphibians and reptiles of Puerto Rico
Fauna of Puerto Rico
List of endemic fauna of Puerto Rico

References

Further reading
Schwartz A, Henderson RW (1991). Amphibians and Reptiles of the West Indies: Descriptions, Distributions, and Natural History. Gainesville, Florida: University of Florida Press. 720 pp. . (Amphisbaena bakeri, p. 555).
Schwartz A, Thomas R (1975). A Check-list of West Indian Amphibians and Reptiles. Carnegie Museum of Natural History Special Publication No. 1. Pittsburgh, Pennsylvania: Carnegie Museum of Natural History. 216 pp. (Amphisbaena bakeri, p. 166).
Stejneger L (1904). "The Herpetology of Porto [sic] Rico." pp. 549–724. In: Annual Report of the Board of Regents of the Smithsonian Institution...for the Year Ending June 30, 1902. Washington, District of Columbia: Government Printing Office. 739 pp. ("Amphisbæna bakeri'', new species", pp. 681–683).

bakeri
Reptiles described in 1904
Taxa named by Leonhard Stejneger
Endemic fauna of Puerto Rico
Reptiles of Puerto Rico
Lizards of the Caribbean